Robin Sandor Melo Cornejo (born 6 March 1987) is a Chilean footballer.

He played for Universidad de Chile and his last club was Deportes Temuco.

Honours

Club
Unión Temuco
 Tercera División de Chile (1): 2009

References
 
 

1987 births
Living people
Chilean footballers
Primera B de Chile players
Chilean Primera División players
Universidad de Chile footballers
Unión Temuco footballers
Unión La Calera footballers
Deportes La Serena footballers
Deportes Temuco footballers
Association football forwards